Diminution may refer to:
Diminution, a musical term
Diminutive
Diminution (satire)
Diminution (risk management)
Chromatin diminution